Looking (Berlin Version) The Feel Trio is a live album featuring performances by Cecil Taylor with William Parker and Tony Oxley recorded in Berlin on November 2, 1989 and released on the FMP label.

Reception

The AllMusic review by Brian Olewnick states "After its members had played together sporadically over the previous couple of years, the Feel Trio was a working group, and the empathy and instinct provided by that luxury is certainly in evidence here... The listener is treated to, and hopefully moved by, the sound of something being born, coming from silence, and an hour later returning there somehow — making it even bigger, more cavernous, and colorful as a result of this trio's awesome creation".

Track listing
All compositions by Cecil Taylor, William Parker & Tony Oxley.
 "First Part" - 36:22 
 "Second Part" - 5:05 
 "Third Part" - 30:49
Recorded at the Total Music Meeting, Quartier Latin, in Berlin, Germany on November 2, 1989

Personnel
Cecil Taylor: piano
William Parker: double bass
Tony Oxley: drums

References

1990 live albums
Cecil Taylor live albums
FMP Records live albums